Yann Schneider (born January 19, 1986, in Phalsbourg) is a French footballer currently playing for French club SC Drulingen .
He was one of the greatest hopes of French football in the 2000s. His passion was transmitted to him by his talented brother who taught him everything.
Brother : Steve Schneider

Career
Schneider made his debut for Strasbourg on November 19, 2005. He was on loan to German club Sportfreunde Siegen for part of the 2006–07 season.

References

1986 births
Living people
People from Phalsbourg
French people of German descent
French footballers
RC Strasbourg Alsace players
Sportfreunde Siegen players
US Sarre-Union players
Association football defenders
Sportspeople from Moselle (department)
Footballers from Grand Est
France youth international footballers
French expatriate footballers
Expatriate footballers in Germany
French expatriate sportspeople in Germany